Phelsuma v-nigra v-nigra Boettger, 1913 (syn. Phelsuma v-nigra Kluge, 1993) is a small diurnal subspecies of geckos. It lives in the Comoros and typically inhabits trees and bushes. Phelsuma v-nigra v-nigra feeds on insects and nectar.

Description 
This lizard belongs to the smallest day geckos. It can reach a maximum length of approximately 10 cm. The body colour is bright green, which may have a blue hue. There is a red v-shaped stripe on the snout and two red bars between the eyes. On the back there often are a number of small red-brick coloured dots. The typical v-shaped marking on the throat may not be present in adults. The ventral side is yellow.

Distribution 
This species only inhabits the island Mohéli in the Comoros.

Habitat 
Phelsuma v-nigra v-nigra is found on banana trees and human dwellings.

Diet 
These day geckos feed on various insects and other invertebrates. They also like to lick soft, sweet fruit, pollen and nectar.

Reproduction 
At a temperature of 28 °C, the young will hatch after approximately 45 days. The juveniles measure 35 mm.

Care and maintenance in captivity 
These animals should be housed in pairs and need a medium-sized, well planted terrarium. The daytime temperature should be between 28 and 30 °C and 24 and 26 °C at night. The humidity should be around 70%. A two-month winter cooldown should be included during which temperature is 25 °C at daytime and 20 °C at night. In captivity, these animals can be fed with crickets, wax moth larvae, fruit flies, mealworms and houseflies.

References 

Henkel, F.-W. and W. Schmidt (1995) Amphibien und Reptilien Madagaskars, der Maskarenen, Seychellen und Komoren. Ulmer Stuttgart. 
McKeown, Sean (1993) The general care and maintenance of day geckos. Advanced Vivarium Systems, Lakeside CA.

Phelsuma